Cardstone is a rural locality in the Cassowary Coast Region, Queensland, Australia.

Geography
Cardstone is a long thin locality following the valley of the Tully River. The northern part of the locality is mostly bushland, but the southern part is farming land. Cardstone village was built near the Tully River to accommodate workers and families of the Kareeya Hydro Power Station. Cardstone was mostly surrounded by the rainforest of the Tully Gorge National Park which forms part of the World Heritage-listed Wet Tropics of Queensland.

History

Construction of the Kareeya Hydro Power Station on the Tully River commenced in 1952 and the power station commenced operation in 1957. The power station was instigated jointly by the Cardwell Shire Council and the Johnstone Shire Council and the name Cardstone is an amalgamation of those two names.

Although it was desired to have a post office in Cardstone in 1954, no local person could be found to carry out the duties. Cardstone Post Office did not open until 11 January 1955. It closed in 1990 when the village closed.

Cardstone State School opened on 18 February 1957. From 1959 to 1967 it was downgraded to a Provisional School and was closed on 14 December 1990 when the village closed.

In about 1990, the power station became fully automated and could be operated from Townsville, making many of the Cardstone operating staff redundant. As only a small number of maintenance workers would be required to visit the station, it was decided to close down the village and relocate the maintenance workers to Tully. As the area was in the Wet Tropics of Queensland World Heritage Site, the village's buildings, then comprising 29 homes, a single men's barracks, a school and a post office, were sold for relocation. All evidence of the village was bulldozed and the  site was replanted with local native species so that it would revert to its natural state. Mature coconut palms and pine trees grown at the village were chopped down during the environmental rehabilitation as they were not local species. There had been a proposal that the village be retained and used as tourist accommodation, but the Cardwell Shire Council opposed the idea believing it would not be cost-effective.

References 

Cassowary Coast Region
Localities in Queensland